Coloured Books may refer to:

 Rainbow Books, a set of standards defining the formats for compact discs
 Rainbow Series, is a series of computer security standards and guidelines. Largely superseded by the Common Criteria. 
 Coloured Book protocols, a set of network protocols used primarily on the UK academic network before the widespread adoption of TCP/IP